Danny Neudecker (born March 2, 1996) is an American pair skater. With his former partner, Nica Digerness, he is the 2017 U.S. national junior champion and placed 10th at the 2017 World Junior Championships. Since May 2022, he has been partnered with Grace Hanns.

Personal life 
Neudecker was born on March 2, 1996, in Seattle, Washington. His mother, Tammie, taught at an elementary school in Seattle before the family moved to Colorado Springs, Colorado. He was raised with a sister, Valerie. After graduating from Cheyenne Mountain High School, he enrolled at the University of Colorado Colorado Springs, pursuing a degree in communications and counseling. He has an interest in languages and is proficient in Russian.

Career

Early years & Beginning of Partnership 
Neudecker began learning to skate when he was five years old after an ice rink opened near his home in Seattle. Competing in men's singles, he skated for two seasons on the juvenile level, two as an intermediate, and two in the novice ranks. He competed as a junior in the 2013–2014 and 2014–2015 seasons.

Pair skating coach Dalilah Sappenfield introduced Neudecker to Nica Digerness, who was also a single skater at the time. The two teamed up in January 2015 and decided to train under Sappenfield at the Broadmoor World Arena in Colorado Springs, Colorado. They placed 7th in novice pairs at the 2016 U.S. Championships.

2016–2017 season 
Digerness/Neudecker dropped plans to continue in the novice ranks after obtaining good junior results at summer club events. In September 2016, they debuted on the ISU Junior Grand Prix series, placing 7th in Saransk, Russia. The following month, the pair finished 13th in Dresden, Germany.

In January, they won the junior title at the 2017 U.S. Championships, having placed first in both segments, and were named in the U.S. team to the 2017 World Junior Championships in Taipei, Taiwan. Ranked 13th in the short program and 9th in the free skate, the pair finished 10th overall in Taipei.

2017–2018 season 
Digerness/Neudecker began competing on the senior level. They placed 9th in the short, 11th in the free, and 11th overall at the 2018 U.S. Championships. They received no international assignments. Following the U.S. Championships, the pair focused on skating skills and choreography for several months while Neudecker recuperated from three bulging disks in his back and joint issues.

2018–2019 season 
Making their senior international debut, Digerness/Neudecker placed fourth at the 2018 CS Lombardia Trophy, an ISU Challenger Series competition in September. U.S. Figure Skating invited them to a Grand Prix event, the 2018 Skate America in October.  They placed sixth.  They placed eighth at the 2019 U.S. Championships.

2019-2020 season & New Partnership 
Digerness and Neudecker competed at the 2019 Warsaw Cup, where they placed fourteenth. They then competed at the 2020 U.S. Championships, where they placed ninth.  On March 28, Neudecker announced that the pair had split.
A couple days later, it was revealed that his new partner was Alexandra Fakhroutdinov.

2020-2021 season & New Coach 
On July 2, 2021, Neudecker announced his and Fakhroutdinov's coaching change to Drew Meekins.

Programs 
(with Digerness)

Competitive highlights 
GP: Grand Prix; CS: Challenger Series; JGP: Junior Grand Prix

Pairs with Hanns

Pairs with Digerness

Men's singles

References

External links 
 

1996 births
American male pair skaters
Living people
Figure skaters from Colorado Springs, Colorado
Sportspeople from Seattle
21st-century American people